
The following lists events that happened during 1828 in South Africa.

Events
 Shaka leads the Zulu army south in a number of raids against the Pondos
 Dingaan overthrows his half brother, Shaka to become king of the Zulus
 The vagrancy and pass laws are abolished in the Cape Colony

Births
 9 May – Andrew Murray, author, educationist and pastor, is born in Cape Town

Deaths
 22 September – Shaka is murdered by his half brother, Dingaan who then becomes king of the Zulus

References
See Years in South Africa for list of References

 
South Africa
Years in South Africa